Rise of the Robots is a 1994 video game. 

Rise of the Robots may also refer to:

Rise of the Robots (book), 2015 book by Martin Ford
Rise 2: Resurrection, also known as Rise of the Robots 2, sequel to the 1994 video game
"Rise of the Robots", a lecture by Kevin Warwick
"Hey! (Rise of the Robots)", a song by The Stranglers from Black and White

See also
Rise Robots Rise, experimental hip hop group
Terminator 3: Rise of the Machines, 2003 film
AI takeover, a hypothetical scenario in which artificial intelligence takes over human intelligence